= Yong Ho =

Yong Ho is a Chinese academic specialising in Chinese anthropology and language. He is known for teaching the Chinese language and its culture to students in accessible and pragmatic ways, as well as for his contribution to the learning of the Chinese language by United Nations officials.

== Early life ==
Ho was born in Nanjing, China. He received his Doctor of Philosophy from Columbia University in 1992 in anthropology and linguistics, specialising in the Chinese language.

Dr Ho served as the Director of Curriculum and Language at the China Institute and taught at New School University, New York.

== Career and contribution to the United Nations ==
In approximately 2001 or 2002, Dr Ho joined the United Nations Chinese Language Program (UNCLP), eventually becoming the Chinese Language Supervisor of the UNCLP. His role there saw him oversee the Chinese courses for the UN language and communications program, including designing the syllabus and selecting teaching materials.

For example, the UNCLP syllabus offered UN officials and diplomats Chinese language courses at 9 different levels, including a three-week summer course at Nanjing University

One such official who partook in Ho's course was UN Secretary-General Ban Ki-Moon who earned an honorary doctorate degree from Nanjing University in 2010 and attended Chinese calligraphy classes in 2011.

Shortly after joining the UNCLP, Dr Ho received the 'UN 21 Award' for his contribution to the Division of Languages team.

In 2014, Dr Ho was once again presented with the 'UN 21 Award', this time by UN Secretary-General Ban Ki Moon for service 'beyond the call of duty' for his 'outstanding contributions to the Chinese Summer Study Programme at Nanjing University'.

== Philosophy and approach to learning Chinese ==
Ho holds the view that, if a person wants to learn the Chinese language well, it must be learnt in-country in the actual language environment.

Given Mandarin Chinese's classification as a Category 4 language by the U.S. Department of State and the perceived difficulties with learning the language, Dr Ho's approach to the study of Chinese involves incorporating practical activities into the Chinese study programme, such as encouraging teachers to make friends with students or encouraging students 'to try Chinese food at Chinatown'.

== Publications ==
Ho's publications include:

- Chinese-English Usage Dictionary: A study reference to the 500 most essential Chinese characters (2012)
- Beginner's Chinese (2010, 2014)
- Intermediate Chinese (2013)
